The Holy Synod of Catholic Bishops of Greece is an association of Episcopal Conference of Roman Catholic bishops in Greece. It is a member of the Council of European Bishops' Conferences and sends a representative to the Commission of the Bishops' Conferences of the European Community (COMECE).

President
 Sevastianos Rossolatos, Archbishop of Athens and Apostolic Administrator for the Roman Catholic Archdiocese of Rhodes.

Members

 Nikolaos Printesis, Archbishop and Metropolitan of Naxos, Andros, Tinos and Mykonos and Apostolic Administrator of the Roman Catholic Diocese of Chios.
 Yannis Spiteris OFM Cap, Archbishop and Metropolitan of Corfu, Zante, Cephalonia and Apostolic Administrator for the Apostolic Vicariate of Thessaloniki.
 Manuel Nin, Titular Bishop of Carcabia and Apostolic Exarch of Greece (Byzantine Rite)
 Petros Stefanou, Bishop of Syros and Milos, Santorini, apostolic administrator for the Roman Catholic Diocese of Crete

See also
Catholic Church in Greece

References

External links
 Catholic Church in Greece
 
 http://www.gcatholic.org/dioceses/conference/045.htm
 http://www.gcatholic.org/dioceses/country/GR.htm
 https://web.archive.org/web/20100825173008/http://www.interkriti.net/ccc/004.htm

Greece
Catholic Church in Greece